Chen Yun-wen (born 28 November 1995) is a Taiwanese baseball pitcher for the Uni-President Lions of the Chinese Professional Baseball League (CPBL).

Career
He attended Pingtung High School and was the second overall pick in the CPBL draft in 2014.

Tsai represented Taiwan at the 2013 18U Baseball World Cup and 2017 World Baseball Classic.

References

1995 births
Living people
Baseball pitchers
People from Pingtung County
Uni-President 7-Eleven Lions players
Taiwanese baseball players
2017 World Baseball Classic players